Odin is the chief god of the Norse pantheon.

Odin may also refer to:

Music
Odin (Wizard album), 2003
Odin (Julian Cope album), 1999
Odin (EP), a 1985 EP by Loudness
Odin Records, a Norwegian record label
Odin (band), a heavy metal band featured in The Decline of Western Civilization Part II: The Metal Years

Fictional entities
Odin (Marvel Comics), a Marvel Universe god based on the mythological god
 Odin (Marvel Cinematic Universe), the film adaptation
Kamen Rider Odin, character from Kamen Rider Ryuki
Odin, a character in The Sandman by Neil Gaiman
Odin, a character portraying the Norse god in Supernatural
Odin, a character in Son of the Mask based on the Norse god
Odin, a character from the Final Fantasy franchise
Orbital Defence Initiative or ODIN, a fictional organization in Philip Reeve's books Infernal Devices and A Darkling Plain
The Organization of Democratic Intelligence Networks, a fictional spy agency in Archer
Odin, the Thor prototype in StarCraft II: Wings of Liberty
Odin, a character in Fire Emblem Fates.
Odin, a character from Hi-Rez's Smite video game

Military
Odin-class submarine, developed by the British Royal Navy in the 1920s
Odin-class coastal defense ship, of the German Imperial Navy in the late 19th and early 20th centuries
SMS Odin, one of the two ships of the class
HNoMS Odin, several warships of the Royal Norwegian Navy
HMS Odin, several warships of the Royal Navy
ICGV Óðinn, several offshore patrol vessel of the Icelandic Coast Guard
Danish ironclad Odin (1872)
Task Force ODIN (Observe, Detect, Identify, and Neutralize), a United States Army aviation battalion
Bristol Odin, a ramjet engine for the British Sea Dart missile

Places
3989 Odin, an asteroid
Odin Planitia, a basin on Mercury
Mount Odin, Baffin Island, Nunavut, Canada
Mount Odin (British Columbia), Canada
Mount Odin (Graham Land), in Graham Land, Antarctica
Mount Odin (Victoria Land), in Victoria Land, Antarctica
Odinland Peninsula, Greenland
Odin Fjord, Greenland
Odin Mine, Peak District, England, UK
Odin, Illinois, a village
Odin, Kansas, a census-designated place
Odin Township, Marion County, Illinois
Odin, Minnesota, a city
Odin, Missouri, a community

Science and technology
 Odin (satellite), an artificial satellite
 ODIN (cable system), a submarine telecommunications cable system
 ODIN Technologies, an RFID integrator based in Virginia
 Odin (code conversion software), software to run Microsoft Windows programs on OS/2
 Odin (firmware flashing software), internal Samsung Android software
 Odin Service Automation, acquired by Ingram Micro

Other
Odin Brewery, in Denmark
Odin (name)
SV Odin Hannover, a German rugby union club
ODIN '59, a Dutch football club
Odinstårnet or Odin Tower, Denmark, a tower
Odin: Photon Sailer Starlight, 1985 Japanese animated science fiction movie
Odin Computer Graphics, UK-based games developer during the 1980s
Odin Teatret, an Oslo theatre company
Odin Stone, one of the Standing Stones of Stenness in Scotland
Odin, class 47 diesel locomotive no: D1666 (later 47081, 47606, 47842), used on British Rail since March 1965

See also
List of names of Odin
List of places named after Odin
Oden (disambiguation)
Odense, the third-largest city in Denmark. The name Odense is derived from Odins Vé, meaning "Odin's sanctuary".
Odinism (disambiguation)
Woden (disambiguation)
Wotan (disambiguation)